Gail M. Scott (born 25 June 1943) is a Canadian television personality. She is a former co-host of Canada AM and was inducted into the Canadian Broadcast Hall of Fame in 2005.

Scott graduated from Carleton University with a bachelor of journalism in 1966 and began her television career with the Canadian Broadcasting Corporation (CBC) at CBOT-TV in Ottawa. In 1971, she became the CBC's parliamentary correspondent. In 1972, she became the parliamentary correspondent for CTV Television Network. In 1976, Scott was the field producer and host of W5. She was co-host of Canada AM from 1978 to 1981 with Norm Perry.

Born in Ottawa, Scott became a part-time member of the CRTC in 1987 and was named commissioner in 1993. As commissioner, Scott and fellow CRTC member William Callahan opposed CRTC's 29 July 1997 granting of the last FM broadcast band in Toronto to CBC because "an Afro-Canadian music station would better serve the public interest in Canada's largest city, which has a 200,000-strong Caribbean community".

Scott was a professor at Ryerson University's School of Journalism in 1989. She was part of the board of directors of the Michener Awards Foundation from 1986 to 1994, serving as its president from 1991 to 1993. On leaving the CRTC in 1998, Scott became a Member of the Ontario Criminal Injuries Compensation Board where she served until 2008. In 2006, she served as an independent board member of the Canadian Television Fund. In 2017, Scott was granted a master's degree in Theological Studies at Trinity College, University of Toronto.

References 

1943 births
Living people
Canadian television journalists
Carleton University alumni
Journalists from Ontario
People from Ottawa
Canadian women television journalists
CTV Television Network people